This is a list of launches made by the Long March rocket family between 2020 and 2029.

Launch statistics

Rocket configurations

Launch outcomes

Launch history

2020

|}

2021 

|}

2022

|}

2023

|}

Future launches

2023

|}

2025

|}

2026

|}

References

Sources 

 
 
 

Space program of the People's Republic of China
Long March